Shenstone is a village in Worcestershire, England, located near Kidderminster.

Villages in Worcestershire